The 2007 African Junior Athletics Championships was the eighth edition of the biennial, continental athletics tournament for African athletes aged 19 years or younger. It was held in Ouagadougou, Burkina Faso, from 9–12 August. A total of 44 events were contested, 22 by men and 22 by women.

Medal table

Medal summary

Men

Women

References

Results
African Junior Championships 2007. World Junior Athletics History. Retrieved on 2013-10-13. Archived.

African Junior Athletics Championships
African Junior Championships
Athletics competitions in Burkina Faso
2007 in Burkinabé sport
African Junior Athletics
Sport in Ouagadougou
21st century in Ouagadougou
International sports competitions hosted by Burkina Faso
2007 in youth sport